Lake Express is a high-speed auto and passenger ferry that is in service on a route across Lake Michigan. Lake Express links the cities of Milwaukee, Wisconsin, and Muskegon, Michigan, from late spring to the fall of each year.

Background
Lake Express is able to cross the lake in two and a half hours. It was constructed by Austal USA in Mobile, Alabama, and began service on June 1, 2004. It was one of the first high-speed catamaran-style auto/passenger ferries built in the United States. It was also the first high-speed car ferry to see service on the Great Lakes, beating out the Spirit of Ontario I, which was beset by a series of last-minute delays, by one month.

On August 21, 2005, the ferry rescued a man whose boat had capsized in the middle of Lake Michigan.

Gallery

See also
SS Badger, another ferry on a more northern route across Lake Michigan

References

External links

 Official site

Ferries of Michigan
Ferries of Wisconsin
Transportation in Milwaukee
Transportation in Michigan
Transportation in Muskegon County, Michigan
2004 ships
Passenger ships of the Great Lakes
Ships built in Mobile, Alabama